Center Junction is an unincorporated village and census-designated place (CDP) in Jones County, Iowa, United States. The population was 111 at the 2010 census, at which time it was a city. It is part of the Cedar Rapids Metropolitan Statistical Area.

Center Junction was once an incorporated city, but following a special election that served as a referendum on the plan, the city council voted in 2015 to sell off its assets, disband, and turn administration over to the county. When the council took the action, then-Mayor Sandy Ricklefs cited the town's ailing finances as the primary reason for disbanding.

History
Center Junction was laid out in 1871. The town promoters hoped the place would become a junction near the geographical center of Jones County, hence the name. There was a junction between the Chicago & North Western Railway and the Chicago, Minneapolis, St. Paul & Pacific Railway at Center Junction for many years. The Chicago & North Western discontinued service on the line in 1951.

Geography
Center Junction is located at  (42.116326, -91.088070).

Demographics

2010 census
As of the census of 2010, there were 111 people, 53 households, and 34 families residing in the city. The racial makeup of the city was 100.0% White. Hispanic or Latino of any race were 4.5% of the population.

There were 53 households, of which 17.0% had children under the age of 18 living with them, 56.6% were married couples living together, 3.8% had a female householder with no husband present, 3.8% had a male householder with no wife present, and 35.8% were non-families. 32.1% of all households were made up of individuals, and 15.1% had someone living alone who was 65 years of age or older. The average household size was 2.09 and the average family size was 2.59.

The median age in the city was 49.9 years. 14.4% of residents were under the age of 18; 4.5% were between the ages of 18 and 24; 19.8% were from 25 to 44; 36.9% were from 45 to 64; and 24.3% were 65 years of age or older. The gender makeup of the city was 51.4% male and 48.6% female.

2000 census
As of the census of 2000, there were 131 people, 59 households, and 35 families residing in the city. The racial makeup of the city was 97.71% White, and 2.29% from two or more races. Hispanic or Latino of any race were 0.76% of the population.

There were 59 households, out of which 25.4% had children under the age of 18 living with them, 55.9% were married couples living together, 5.1% had a female householder with no husband present, and 39.0% were non-families. 33.9% of all households were made up of individuals, and 18.6% had someone living alone who was 65 years of age or older. The average household size was 2.22 and the average family size was 2.89.

In the city, the population was spread out, with 19.8% under the age of 18, 6.1% from 18 to 24, 25.2% from 25 to 44, 29.8% from 45 to 64, and 19.1% who were 65 years of age or older. The median age was 44 years. For every 100 females, there were 98.5 males. For every 100 females age 18 and over, there were 90.9 males.

The median income for a household in the city was $32,917, and the median income for a family was $41,750. Males had a median income of $30,625 versus $20,500 for females. The per capita income for the city was $16,476. There were no families and 5.7% of the population living below the poverty line, including no under eighteens and 17.4% of those over 64.

References

Census-designated places in Iowa
Census-designated places in Jones County, Iowa
Cedar Rapids, Iowa metropolitan area
Former populated places in Iowa
Populated places disestablished in 2015